Subanguina wevelli (Seed-gall nematode; syn. Afrina wevelli Van den Berg, 1985 ) is a plant pathogenic nematode and an invasive species.

References 

Tylenchida
Plant pathogenic nematodes